Leopold Tõnson (13 January 1878 Paldiski (or 14 January 1874 Haapsalu) – 5 January 1935 Tallinn) was an Estonian military personnel and sport personnel.

He was one of the first in Estonia who started to propagate athletics, rowing and bandy. In 1909 he managed the first athletics competition in Tallinn; he himself won this competition.

During the Estonian War of Independence, he was the commander of Kalev Infantry Battalion.

From 1911 to 1913, 1918 to 1919, 1922 and 1924 to 1928 he was the head of Estonian Sports Association Kalev.

Awards:
 1931: Order of the Cross of the Eagle, III class.

References

1870s births
1935 deaths
Year of birth uncertain
Estonian military personnel
Estonian people in sports
Estonian male rowers
Estonian military personnel of the Estonian War of Independence
People from Paldiski